A Boy Named 68818 is a true-life account of Israel "Srulik" Stark in the Holocaust, his spiritual resistance, and rebuilding afterwards, written by his daughter, Miriam (Stark) Miller. Aimed for children aged 10–14 as well as adults, the book was published in 2015 and distributed by Feldheim Publishers. It was praised by several Jewish and Holocaust memorial organizations.

Outline 
The story of the book is divided into three sections, each one prefaced with a Holocaust related poem. The first section, titled Fledgling, describes Stark's life before the outbreak of World War II, living his early years in Podhoryan near Munkacs. The author created for him fictional pet dove named "Taibele" as a device for the protagonist to share his thoughts. The first section concludes with the Jewish community of Carpatho-Ruthenia's deportation to Auschwitz in mid-1944. The story's second section talks about Stark's ordeals in the Holocaust, from the grueling slave labor in Auschwitz, Mauthausen and Melk to the death march to Ebensee. In Part Three, the book tells about recovering and rebuilding after the Holocaust, with Stark's emigration to the United States. Throughout the story, there are full-color illustrations by Gadi Pollack and Alex Firley. At the end of the book are over 130 pages of Appendices: a glossary; a historical overview of Europe between 1914 and 1948; a timeline of events and maps, tracing Stark's life as well as the region's Jewish history at that time in general; an explanation to of the book's illustrations; a learning guide, extracting lessons in history, geography, phsycolgy, Judaism, etc. from the story; and "Srulik's Personal Album", photographs of Stark, his family, and related objects.

Reception 
The book received much praise from Jewish and Holocaust Memorial organizations. Linda Hooper, coordinator of the Paper Clips Project and the Children's Holocaust Memorial in Whitwell, Tennessee said that the book "will bring the realities of the effects of intolerance and mob mentality to life for students," and that "this is a story that should be shared!" Rabbi Israel Meir Lau, chairman of the Yad Vashem Council and former Chief Rabbi of Israel, called the book "spellbinding" and said that "[Starck is] an ember saved from the inferno of World War II." Rabbi Meyer H. May, Executive Director of the Simon Wiesenthal Center says that the story "will surely inspire young people to treasure the richness of faith". The director of the Kleinman Family Holocaust Education Center, Sholom Friedman said it's "a poignant memoir," and Rabbi Shmuel Yaakov Klein, director of publications of Torah Umesorah, said that the publication is "a valuable source...heartrending...brimming with content...a welcome addition to Holocaust curricula." Rabbi Berel Wein, director of The Destiny Foundation, wrote in an approbation that "the book is filled with fascinating detail, drama and a touch of necessary irony," and Esther Farbstein, a notable Holocaust historian, wrote that she hopes "it will reach a wide audience of young people." Nachum Segal of the JM in the AM radio show interviewed Starck about the book.

References 

Personal accounts of the Holocaust
Books about the Holocaust
2015 non-fiction books
2015 children's books
Books about Jews and Judaism